Faddija – La legge della vendetta is a 1950 Italian crime melodrama film directed by Roberto Bianchi Montero.

Cast 
 Otello Toso
 Luisa Rossi
 William Tubbs
 Piero Palermini
 Olga Solbelli
 Silvio Bagolini
Dario Dolci
Luisa Rossi
Edula Lollobrigida
Bianca Manenti

External links 
 
 Faddija - La legge della vendetta at Variety Distribution

1950 films
Italian black-and-white films
1950s Italian-language films
Films set in Sardinia
Films shot in Sardinia
Films directed by Roberto Bianchi Montero
Films with screenplays by Roberto Bianchi Montero
Italian crime drama films
1950 crime drama films
1950s Italian films